The Judge and the Assassin is a 1976 French drama film directed by Bertrand Tavernier that stars Philippe Noiret, Isabelle Huppert, Michel Galabru, and Jean-Claude Brialy. Set in France in the 1890s, it shows the capture after a trail of rapes and murders of a possibly deranged ex-soldier, based on the historical Joseph Vacher, and how he is befriended by an ambitious judge who leads him into incriminating himself. The film won two César Awards in 1977.

Plot
Ex-sergeant Bouvier, expelled from the army for fits of violence, shoots at Louise when she rejects him and then puts his last two bullets in his own head. The pair survive, and he is shut away in an asylum. Rejecting civil society on his release, he wanders the countryside raping and murdering isolated teenage children. His crimes are followed closely by Rousseau, a provincial judge, and when Bouvier enters his jurisdiction he is arrested. Pretending to be his friend who will get him off on a plea of insanity, Rousseau humours his whims and encourages him to incriminate himself. In fact, Rousseau is seeking personal glory and career advancement. When Bouvier is condemned, Rousseau's working-class mistress Rose joins the strikers in the town factory. A postscript notes that hundreds more children died in factories than Bouvier's few highly-publicised victims.

Selected cast
Philippe Noiret as Judge Rousseau
Michel Galabru as Joseph Bouvier
Isabelle Huppert as Rose, Rousseau's mistress
Jean-Claude Brialy as public prosecutor Villedieu
Renée Faure as Rousseau's mother
Cécile Vassort as Louise, courted by Bouvier 
Jean-Roger Caussimon as a street singer
Jean Bretonnière as a parliamentary deputy
Daniel Russo as jailer
Christine Pascal (uncredited) as a striker

See also
 Isabelle Huppert on screen and stage

References

External links
 
 

1976 films
1970s crime comedy-drama films
1970s historical comedy-drama films
Films about capital punishment
Films directed by Bertrand Tavernier
Films featuring a Best Actor César Award-winning performance
Films set in the 1890s
1970s French-language films
Films with screenplays by Jean Aurenche
Films with screenplays by Pierre Bost
Films scored by Philippe Sarde
French serial killer films
French crime comedy-drama films
French historical comedy-drama films
1970s serial killer films
1970s French films